Krasavino is the name of several inhabited localities in Russia.

Urban localities
Krasavino, Veliky Ustyug, Vologda Oblast, a town under the administrative jurisdiction of the town of oblast significance of Veliky Ustyug in Vologda Oblast

Rural localities
Krasavino, Kotlassky District, Arkhangelsk Oblast, a village in Zabelinsky Selsoviet of Kotlassky District in Arkhangelsk Oblast
Krasavino, Krasnoborsky District, Arkhangelsk Oblast, a village in Belosludsky Selsoviet of Krasnoborsky District in Arkhangelsk Oblast
Krasavino, Vilegodsky District, Arkhangelsk Oblast, a village in Pavlovsky Selsoviet of Vilegodsky District in Arkhangelsk Oblast
Krasavino, Milofanovsky Selsoviet, Nikolsky District, Vologda Oblast, a village in Milofanovsky Selsoviet of Nikolsky District in Vologda Oblast
Krasavino, Niginsky Selsoviet, Nikolsky District, Vologda Oblast, a village in Niginsky Selsoviet of Nikolsky District in Vologda Oblast
Krasavino, Verkhnekemsky Selsoviet, Nikolsky District, Vologda Oblast, a village in Verkhnekemsky Selsoviet of Nikolsky District in Vologda Oblast
Krasavino, Zelentsovsky Selsoviet, Nikolsky District, Vologda Oblast, a village in Zelentsovsky Selsoviet of Nikolsky District in Vologda Oblast
Krasavino, Nyuksensky District, Vologda Oblast, a village in Dmitriyevsky Selsoviet of Nyuksensky District in Vologda Oblast
Krasavino, Velikoustyugsky District, Vologda Oblast, a village in Samotovinsky Selsoviet of Velikoustyugsky District in Vologda Oblast